The Continental Marines were the amphibious infantry of the American Colonies (and later the United States) during the American Revolutionary War. The Corps was formed by the Continental Congress on November 10, 1775 and was disbanded in 1783. Their mission was multi-purpose, but their most important duty was to serve as onboard security forces, protecting the captain of a ship and his officers. During naval engagements, in addition to manning the cannons along with the crew of the ship, Marine sharpshooters were stationed in the fighting tops of a ship's masts specifically to shoot the opponent's officers, naval gunners, and helmsmen.

In all, there were 131 Colonial Marine officers and probably no more than 2,000 enlisted Colonial Marines. Though individual Marines were enlisted for the few U.S. Naval vessels, the organization would not be re-created until 1798. Despite the gap between the disbanding of the Continental Marines and the current organization, the Continental Marines' successor, U.S. Marine Corps, marks November 10, 1775 as its inception.

History
In accordance with the Continental Marine Act of 1775, Congress decreed: 

These two battalions were initially intended to be drawn from George Washington's army for the planned invasion of Halifax, Nova Scotia, the main British reinforcement and supply point. In reality only one battalion was formed by December, with five companies and a total of about 300 men. Plans to form the second battalion were suspended indefinitely after several British regiments-of-foot and cavalry, supported by 3,000 soldiers of the German British-allied contingent, landed in Nova Scotia, making the planned amphibious assault impossible. Washington was reluctant to support the Marines, and suggested that they be recruited from New York or Philadelphia instead.

The Continental Marines' only Commandant was Captain Samuel Nicholas, commissioned on 28 November 1775; and the first Marine barracks were located in Philadelphia. Robert Mullen, whose mother owned Tun Tavern, later received a commission as a captain in June 1776 and likely used it as his recruiting rendezvous.
Four additional Marine Security Companies were also raised and helped George Washington defend Philadelphia.

Marines were used by the US to carry out amphibious landings and raids during the American Revolution. Marines joined Commodore Esek Hopkins of the Continental Navy's first squadron on its first cruise in the Caribbean. They landed twice in Nassau, in the Bahamas, to capture naval supplies from the British. The first landing, named the Battle of Nassau, led by Captain Samuel Nicholas, consisted of 250 marines and sailors who landed in New Providence and marched to Nassau Town. There, they wrought havoc and seized naval stores of shells, shot, and cannon, but failed to capture any of the desperately needed gunpowder. The second landing, led by a Lieutenant Trevet, landed at night and captured several ships along with the naval stores. Sailing back to Rhode Island, the squadron captured four small prize ships. The squadron finally returned on 8 April 1776, with 7 dead marines and four wounded. Though Hopkins was disgraced for failing to obey orders, Nicholas was promoted to major on 25 June and tasked with raising 4 new companies of Marines for 4 new frigates then under construction.

In December 1776, the Continental Marines were tasked to join Washington's army at Trenton to slow the progress of British troops southward through New Jersey. Unsure what to do with the Marines, Washington added the Marines to a brigade of Philadelphia militia, also dressed in green. Though they were unable to arrive in time to meaningfully affect the Battle of Trenton, they were able to fight at the Battle of Princeton.

Continental Marines landed and captured Nautilus Island and the Majabagaduce peninsula in the Penobscot Expedition, but withdrew with heavy losses when Commodore Dudley Saltonstall's force failed to capture the nearby fort. A group under Navy Captain James Willing left Pittsburgh, traveled down the Ohio and Mississippi Rivers, captured a ship, and in conjunction with other Continental Marines, brought by ship from the Gulf of Mexico raided British Loyalists on the shore of Lake Pontchartrain. The last official act of the Continental Marines was to escort a stash of silver crowns, on loan from Louis XVI of France, from Boston to Philadelphia to enable the opening of the Bank of North America.

At the end of the Revolutionary War, both the Continental Navy and Marines were disbanded in April 1783. Although individual marines stayed on for the few U.S. naval vessels left, the last Continental Marine was discharged in September. In all, there were 131 Colonial marine officers and probably no more than 2,000 enlisted Colonial marines. Though individual marines were enlisted for the few U.S. naval vessels, the organization would not be re-created until 1798. Despite the gap between the disbanding of the Continental Marines and the establishment of the actual United States Marine Corps (USMC), the USMC deems November 10, 1775 as its official founding date. This is traditional in marine units and is similar to the practice of the British and Dutch marines.

Timeline
1775, October 13 Second Continental Congress convenes and directs the acquisition, fitting out, and manning of two vessels for the Continental Navy. Since marines are a normal part of warship's complement, this is the first (albeit indirect) authorization for the enlistment of Continental Marines.

1775, November 10 The Continental Marines are created.

1775, December Five companies of about 300 Marines were raised. While armed, they were not equipped with uniforms. They head South for the Caribbean where the five companies joined Commodore Esek Hopkins of the Continental Navy's first squadron on its first cruise.

1776, March Nicholas' Marines land on New Providence Island, Bahamas. In 13 days they secure 2 forts, occupy Nassau, control the Government House, seize 88 guns, 16,535 shells and other supplies. Returning from the raid, they encountered a British ship. Marines engaged the ship with muskets and assisted in manning the broadside cannon. Commodore Hopkins ignored his ambitious orders to sweep the southern seas of British ships, and instead raided the Bahamas for gunpowder for Washington's army. Nicholas' Marines made an opposed landing and marched on Nassau Town, on the island of New Providence, seizing shot, shells and cannon. However, a failed attempt at a surprise attack the day before had warned the defenders, who sent off their stock of gunpowder in the night. Sailing back to Rhode Island, the squadron captured four small prize ships. The squadron finally returned on April 8, 1776, with 7 dead Marines (including Lt. John Fitzpatrick), and four wounded. Though Hopkins was disgraced for failing to obey orders, Nicholas was promoted to major on June 25 and tasked with raising 4 new companies of Marines for 4 new frigates then under construction. Among the newly commissioned Marines was Captain Robert Mullan.

1776, October Sergeants William Hamilton and Alexander Neilson become the first recorded Marine mustangs when they are promoted to lieutenant.

1776, December Marines were tasked to join Washington's army at Trenton to slow the progress of British troops southward through New Jersey. Unsure what to do with the Marines, Washington added the Marines to a brigade of Philadelphia militia, also dressed in green. Though they were unable to arrive in time to affect the battle of Trenton, they assisted in the decisive American victory at Princeton. Later that spring, Washington incorporated some of the Marines into artillery units of his reorganized Army.

1778, January A Marine detachment sails down the Mississippi River and secures New Orleans to keep British traders out. Continental Marines landed and captured Nautilus Island and the Majabagaduce peninsula in the Penobscot Expedition. A group under Navy Captain James Willing left Pittsburgh, traveled down the Ohio and Mississippi Rivers, captured a ship and in conjunction with other Continental Marines brought by ship from the Gulf of Mexico raided British Loyalists on the shore of Lake Pontchartrain.

1778, April A Marine detachment nominally under the command of John Paul Jones makes two raids on British soil.

1783, January Marines board and seize the British ship Baille in the West Indies

1785, June After the end of the American Revolutionary War (January 1783), the Alliance is sold. The last official act of the Continental Marines was to escort a stash of French silver crowns on loan from Louis XVI, from Boston to Philadelphia, to enable the opening of the Bank of North America. The Continental Marines and the Continental Navy are disbanded.

Continental Marine uniforms

On September 5, 1776, the Naval Committee published the Continental Marines uniform regulations specifying green coats with white facings (lapels, cuffs, and coat lining), with a leather high collar to protect against cutlass slashes and to keep a man's head erect. Its memory is preserved by the moniker "Leatherneck", and the high collar on Marine dress uniforms. Though legend attributes the green color to the traditional color of riflemen, Colonial Marines carried muskets. More likely, green cloth was simply plentiful in Philadelphia, and it served to distinguish Marines from the red of the British or the blue of the Continental Army and Navy. Also, Sam Nicholas's hunting club wore green uniforms, hence his recommendation to the committee was for green. Another possible reason for the green coats with white facings is that they were using captured uniforms as many loyalist units such as the Queen's Own Loyal Provincial Regiment utilized the green-faced white coats.

Continental Marine pay

See also
 History of the United States Marine Corps

References

Sources
 United States Marine Corps, Report on Marine Corps Duplication of Effort between Army and Navy December 17, 1932. Contains a very detailed account of almost all the actions of the Continental Marines and USMC until 1932. It's available in scanned TIFF format from the archives of the Marine Corps University.
 George E. Buker, The Penobscot Expedition: Commodore Saltonstall and the Massachusetts Conspiracy of 1779, Naval Institute Press, 2002.

External links

 Smith, Charles R., Marines in the Revolution: A History of the Continental Marines in the American Revolution, 1775–1783, illustrated by Major Charles H. Waterhouse, USMCR, History and Museums Division, Headquarters, U.S. Marine Corps, Washington, D.C. 20380, 1975. Forward and Table of Contents online at scuttlebuttsmallchow.com

 
Disbanded marine forces
Military units and formations disestablished in 1783
United States Marine Corps in the 18th and 19th centuries